Carlo Dalmazio Minoretti (17 September 1861 – 13 March 1938) was a Cardinal of the Roman Catholic Church who served as Archbishop of Genoa.

Early life and education
Carlo Minoretti was born in Cogliate, Lombardy. He was educated at the Seminary of Milan. Ordained priest in 1884, he served as a faculty member of Seminary of Monza from 1890 until 1907, when he became a faculty member of the Seminary of Milan until 1909. He did pastoral work in the Archdiocese of Milan until 1915.

Episcopate
Pope Benedict XV appointed him Bishop of Crema on 6 December 1915. He was consecrated on 16 January 1916 by Andrea Ferrari, Cardinal Archbishop of Milan. Pope Pius XI promoted him to the metropolitan see of Genoa on 16 January 1925.

Cardinalate
Pope Pius XI created him Cardinal-Priest of Sant'Eusebio in the consistory of 16 December 1929. He died in 1938 in Genoa in office.

References

External links
The Cardinals of the Holy Roman Church - Biographical Dictionary
Catholic Hierarchy data for this cardinal 

1861 births
1938 deaths
People from the Province of Milan
20th-century Italian Roman Catholic archbishops
Roman Catholic archbishops of Genoa
20th-century Italian cardinals